Tyrone Ollie Jr., (born October 22, 1991), professionally known as Chase N Dough (often stylized as ChaseNDough), is an American record producer, songwriter and graphic designer from Chicago, Illinois. He has produced music for artists such as King Louie, Sasha Go Hard, Tink, Spenzo, Nick Cannon, RondoNumbaNine, Dreezy, Lil Durk, Fredo Santana, Young Chop, OTF NuNu, Eldorado Red, LEP Bogus Boys, Sir Michael Rocks, Big Pooh, Chella H, Rockie Fresh Treasur' and many others. He's known from the Drill Music scene in Chicago.

Early life 

Chase N Dough was born October 22, 1991, in Chicago, Illinois in the Southside region. He first started making beats in the 9th grade at his friend Terrell's house. Dough had never had the opportunity to have access to a computer. He was bored one day after listening to some demos and decided to search "how to make a beat on your computer". He was inspired that people who lived around him made music and they weren't famous. He found FL Studio. .[1] but only really used it to make time fly at the time. His Aunt had later purchased a desktop computer. He then took it upon himself to download FL Studio on her computer as well. After multiple incidents with his Aunt's computer, his mother decided to rent him a Dell desktop computer. He once again installed the demo version of FL Studio on his computer. He lived with his mother along with his little brother. She was a single Mother. He developed some what of skill. Initially, Dough wanted to rap, and started making beats so that he could have beats to rap to. He later moved in with his other Aunt on his Dad's side along with his cousin Whitey G. They were like brothers. There, his aunt had everything he needed. Computer, food and the internet. Dough and his family moved a lot. His family had moved to Evergreen Park, Illinois where he ran across a friend by the name of G-Knox. They exchanged information and G-Knox had given Dough a copy of FL Studio and a few other software programs and drum kits. -

Production discography

2011 
King Louie - Hardbody

 14. "G Shit"
 16. "Smokin Dope"

2012 
Spenzo - Ain't You Spenzo

 11. "Dirty Diana"

King Louie - The Motion Picture

 05. "Chet Chet - Truth Hurts" (featuring King Louie)

Chase N Dough - iPACK vol. 1

 02. "Spenzo - Ova"
 18. "King Louie - He's On Fire"

King Louie - 

 10. "She Want Me" (featuring Leek)
 22. "Chiraq Playaz"

Ebone Hoodrich - Books & Kush

 13. "Movie Life" (featuring Jibbs, Young Diesel & King Louie)

King Samson - Party x Bullshit Reloaded

 11. "KOD X Factory"
 14. "Hoover Flow"
 15. "Homocide" (featuring Bo Deal)

Eldorado Red - McRado's 2

 08. "Da Big Homie" (featuring LEP Bogus Boys)

Naledge – #GoNaledgeGo (Mixtape)

 05. "Cufflinks and Dress Shoes" (featuring Rapper Big Pooh & Bad Lucc)

M.I.C - Next 2 Blow

 05. "They Don't Like Me"
 11. "Ima Winner" (featuring Tink)

S.Dot - H&M

 05. "#NoTalkin"

Chris Mille - Hungry 4 A Mill

 01. "Intro"

Chet Chet - LaCostAlot

 01. "Grizzle Grizzy" (featuring Boss Woo)
 02. "Can't Trust A Soul"
 03. "Loud"
 04. "Know My Name"
 05. "It's On Me"
 06. "On Chief"
 07. "Swamp Nigga"
 08. "Sometimes Somedays" (featuring Lil Durk)
 09. "Truth Hurts" (featuring King Louie)

Young Giftz - Lake Effect 1.5 (The Re-Rock)

 18. "Blow" (featuring Blanco Caine & KON)

2013 
Mikey Dollaz - Street Life

 03. "Add Em Up"  
 04. "Shot Down" (feat. I.L Will & Lil Chris) 
 05. "Who Sent You Off"

Ebone Hoodrich - Stuck N Da Trap 2

 14. "Kick A Door" (featuring Bo Deal)

I.L Will - Tattz & Flattz

 04. "Bop" (Feat. DJ Nate)
 05. "Let The Drugs Do The Talkin'" (featuring King Deazel)
 11. "Poppin Flatz" (featuring Mikey Dollaz)

I.L Will - Dope God

 08. "Can't Do"
 09. "No Problems" (featuring. Rico Recklezz)
 16. "My Team"

Dreezy & Mikey Dollaz - 

 03. "I Need Bread"
 08. "All I Need"

Mikey Dollaz - Sex Music

 01. "Do To You" 
 02. "I Can't Lie" (featuring Asa) 
 11. "Tell The Truth"

Sasha Go Hard - 

 06. "Keep It 100" (feat. Rockie Fresh)

Team No Lackin' The Mixtape

 08. "Flexin" (King Yella featuring $wagg)

King Yung Yella - Skeeze World

 02. "Action" (featuring Rico Recklezz)

Lil Chris - Money Talks

 16. "Boss Shit" (featuring Bo Deal)

Giftz - Position Of Power

 08. "Caravan" (Feat. KON)
 09. "Count It" (featuring 3D Na'tee)
 17. "Position Of Power (Outro/Interlude)"

RondoNumbaNine - Steve Drive

 09. "My Squad"

RondoNumbaNine - Real Nigga For Life

 05. "Trap Spot" (featuring Fredo Santana)
 07. "Play for Keeps"

King100James - The King100Jame$ Version

 05. "Where Da Cash At"

King Louie - Best Of March Madness

 17. "Goldie Wit Da Pimpin (Remix)"

2014 
Bosstop - At Yo Neck

 10. "Not Us"
 15. "Foreclosures"

I.L Will & Mikey Dollaz - OvaTyme

 01. "Ovatyme"

DJ Honorz & DJ Citi - Honor The Citi

 01. "I.L Will - Poppin'"

L'A Capone - Separate Myself

 03. "Play For Keeps" (featuring RondoNumbaNine)

Dotarachi - Call Me Dotarachi

 10. "Cum 1st" (featuring Mike Notez)

I.L Will - Problem Child

 04. "Love Foreign" (featuring Lil Durk)

Sasha Go Hard - FEEL SO GOOD

 09. "WTF" (featuring I.L Will)

Yung Gwapa - King Habitz

 10. "Bank Roll" (featuring Blanco Caine)

2015 
KD Young Cocky - Heat Of The Moment

 01. "Pray For Me"
 02. "He Not" (featuring Zona Man & Dotarchi)
 03. "Loyalty" (featuring Bo Deal)
 04. "Check Up" 
 06. "In love wit Money"
 07. "In It" (featuring Neil Gang)
 08. "Drunk Sex"
 09. "Drug" (featuring Lovandre)
 10. "Boss Up" (featuring Neil Gang)
 11. "Miles Away" (featuring Chi Hoover)

Mikey Dollaz - Music On Drugz

 09. "Smoke All Day" (featuring Allegra)

Chi-Raq Official Soundtrack

 09. "My City" by Nick Cannon

KD Young Cocky - This Is For You

 01. "This Is For You Intro (Bussin)"

Boss Top - Problem Child

 04. Foreclosures 2
 14. Play 4 Keeps

Chase N Dough - Paws Of Rotts

 01. "Jay Stonez & Tink - No Love"
 02. "KD Young Cocky, Zona Man & Dotarachi - He Not"
 03. "Dotarachi & 600 Breezy" - Blowin Like A Fan"
 04. "KD Young Cocky & Chi Hoover - Miles Away"
 05. "King Samson & Nino - Keep Me Straight"
 06. "Yay Diego - Don't Sleep"
 07. "Yung Stakks, King Louie & Chella H - BYLU"
 08. "King Samson - Pitch Black"
 09. "Blanco Caine & Chris Crack - Supa Playa"

White Gzus - Stackin' N Mackin' 2

 04. "Use My Style"

Neil Gang - Black Snow

 01. "Forever Ass"
 02. "Proud Of Me"
 03. "NewbeJay"
 04. "My Bae"
 05. "Merry Christmas"

2016 
Hypno Carlito - Never Say Never

 04. "I Know The Feeling"

Chase N Dough - Private Party on the West End

 01. "Neil Gang - You"
 02. "Lovandre - Make You Say"
 03. "KD Young Cocky & Jus Foreign - Lie To You"
 04. "Neil Gang - Forever As"
 05. "KD Young Cocky - On My Way"
 06. "Neil Gang - Newbe Jay"

Chase N Dough - Do A Number

 01. "Chase N Dough & Whitey G - Do a Number"

Yung Stakks - In My Own Lane

 03. "I'm The Plug"
 11. "Who Would've Thought"

2017 
Hittz

 00. "Invincible" (featuring Dotarachi)

King Deazel - C.H.I.C.A.G.O

 02. "The Package" (featuring Young Buck)
 09. "Lebron Jordan"
 11. "Fly High" (featuring Bra$il)
 15. "I'm God"

Tay 600 - SixOfEm

 02. "My Story"

Pocahontas - Catastrophe

 02. "Fed Up"
 04 "Dey On Me" (featuring Dotarachi)

2018
Treasur' - ADDICTION

 01 Addiction

References

External links 
Chase N Dough on SoundCloud
Chase N Dough on Twitter
Chase N Dough on Facebook
 Ruby Hornet [Interview] Record Producers: Chase N Dough =
 I.L WIll feat. Lil Durk & Stunt Staylor - Love Foreign (Remix)  
 Stream The Chi-Raq Movie Official Soundtrack  
 FSD Feature: Spenzo: Coming of Age 

1991 births
African-American record producers
American graphic designers
American hip hop record producers
Drill musicians
Living people
Midwest hip hop musicians
Musicians from Chicago
Record producers from Illinois
21st-century African-American people